Michael Hicks-Beach (1760–1830) was the member of Parliament for the constituency of Cirencester for the parliaments of 1794 to 1818.

He was the son of Sir Howe Hicks, 6th Baronet, and the brother of Sir William Hicks, 7th Baronet. His elder son Michael Beach Hicks-Beach was the father of Sir Michael Hicks Beach, 8th Baronet, and his younger son William Beach was also an MP.

References 

1760 births
1830 deaths
Michael
Members of Parliament for Cirencester
British MPs 1790–1796
British MPs 1796–1800
Members of the Parliament of the United Kingdom for English constituencies
UK MPs 1801–1802
UK MPs 1802–1806
UK MPs 1806–1807
UK MPs 1807–1812
UK MPs 1812–1818